The Homeland Security Subcommittee on Counterterrorism, Law Enforcement and Intelligence is a subcommittee within the House Homeland Security Committee. Between 2019 and 2023, it was known as the Homeland Security Subcommittee on Intelligence and Counterterrorism.

Members, 117th Congress

Historical membership rosters

115th Congress

116th Congress

External links
 Official Site

Homeland Intelligence